Hans Eriksson is a Swedish sprint canoer who competed in the early 1950s. He won a gold medal in the K-4 1000 m event at the 1950 ICF Canoe Sprint World Championships in Copenhagen.

References

Swedish male canoeists

Living people
Year of birth missing (living people)
ICF Canoe Sprint World Championships medalists in kayak